Hartpury University Football Club is a football club based in Hartpury, England, and are the football team of the Hartpury College. They are currently members of the Hellenic League Division One and play at Hartpury College.

History
In 2020, Hartpury College formed and entered Hartpury University into the Hellenic League Division Two North. In 2022, following a successful season in the Herefordshire FA County League, the club was admitted into the Hellenic League Division One.

Ground
The club currently play at the facilities at Hartpury College.

References

Hartpury College
Association football clubs established in 2020
2020 establishments in England
Football clubs in England
Football clubs in Gloucestershire
University and college football clubs in England
Hellenic Football League